Malkhed Dam, is an earthfill dam on Kholad river near Chandur, Amravati district in state of Maharashtra in India.

Specifications

Purpose
 Irrigation
 Water Supply

See also
 Dams in Maharashtra
 List of reservoirs and dams in India

References

Dams in Amravati district
Dams completed in 1972
1972 establishments in Maharashtra